Gabriella Taylor was the defending champion, but lost in the first round to Paula Badosa Gibert.

Elena Rybakina won the title after Irina Khromacheva retired in the final at 7–5, 3–3.

Seeds

Draw

Finals

Top half

Bottom half

References
Main Draw

Launceston Tennis International - Singles
Launceston Tennis International